Heliozela argyrozona is a moth of the family Heliozelidae. It was described in the genus Antispila by Edward Meyrick in 1918 and moved to the genus Heliozela by Erik J. van Nieukerken and Henk Geertsema in 2015. It is found in South Africa.

References

Endemic moths of South Africa
Moths described in 1918
Heliozelidae
Moths of Africa